Kropyvnytske is a village located in Novoukrainka Raion, Kirovohrad Oblast, Ukraine. It is the birthplace of Marko Kropyvnytskyi in whom the village is named for. Kropyvnytske belongs to Hannivka rural hromada, one of the hromadas of Ukraine.

References 

Villages in Novoukrainka Raion